North Gem High School is a high school in Bancroft, Idaho. Grades K-12 are located in the same facility.

Notes

Public high schools in Idaho
Schools in Caribou County, Idaho